Henry Ford (1863–1947) was an American industrialist, the founder of the Ford Motor Company.

Henry Ford may also refer to:

People

Politicians
 Henry Ford (Michigan legislator) (1825–1894), Michigan state senator
 Henry Ford (MP for Weymouth) (1386–1397), Member of Parliament for Weymouth
 Henry P. Ford (1837–1905), mayor of Pittsburgh, Pennsylvania, from 1896 to 1899
 Henry Ford (Tiverton MP) (1617–1684), English politician
 Henry Harrison Ford (1844–1887), member of the Texas House

Illustrators
 Henry Justice Ford (1860–1941), British illustrator
 Henry Ford (illustrator) (1828–1894), American illustrator

Others
 Henry Ford II (1917–1987),  American business executive, grandson of Henry Ford
 E. B. Ford (1901–1988), also known as Henry Ford, British ecological geneticist
 Henry Ford (defensive lineman) (born 1971), American football defensive lineman
 Henry Ford (defensive back) (born 1931), American football defensive back
 Henry Jones Ford (1851–1925), political scientist
 Henry Ford (professor) (1753–1813), professor of Arabic and principal of Magdalen Hall, University of Oxford

Other uses
 The Henry Ford, museum and historical Greenfield Village
 Henry Ford Hospital, hospital founded with money from Henry Ford
 Henry Ford College, college in Dearborn Michigan
 Henry Ford Health System, Metro Detroit
 Henry Ford II High School, Sterling Heights, Michigan
 Henry Ford Bridge, Los Angeles County, Southern California

See also
 Harry Ford (disambiguation)
 Henri Ford, Haitian-American pediatric surgeon
 Henry (disambiguation)
 Ford (disambiguation)

Ford, Henry